Codex Vindobonensis Philos. 157 is a manuscripts of the treatise On the Soul of Aristotle. It is designated by symbol Rd. Paleographically it had been assigned to the 15th century. It is written in Greek minuscule letters. The manuscript contains a complete text of the treatise. 

The text of the manuscript represents the textual family π. 

The manuscript was not cited by Tiendelenburg, Torstrik, Biehl, Apelt, and Ross in his critical editions of the treatise On the Soul. It means the manuscript has not high value. Currently it is housed at the Austrian National Library (Philos. 157) at Vienna.

See also

 Codex Vindobonensis Philos. 2
 Codex Vindobonensis Philos. 75

Notes and references

Further reading

 Paweł Siwek, Aristotelis tractatus De anima graece et latine, Desclée, Romae 1865. 

15th-century manuscripts
Aristotelian manuscripts

Manuscripts of the Austrian National Library